Krasny Oktyabr Machine-Building Enterprise is a company based in Saint Petersburg, Russia.

The Red October Machine-Building Enterprise is a major producer of helicopter engines and components, as well as being the only producer of helicopter engine transmissions in the former USSR. It also has produced fighter jet engines and rocket engines.

References

External links
 Official website

Aircraft engine manufacturers of Russia
Companies based in Saint Petersburg
Ministry of the Aviation Industry (Soviet Union)
Aircraft engine manufacturers of the Soviet Union